Hernán Figueredo Alonzo (born 15 May 1985), is a Uruguayan footballer who plays as a midfielder for Liverpool Montevideo.

Career
Figueredo started his career playing with his home team C.A. Bella Vista. In mid 2008, he was sent out on loan for six-months to C.S.D. Villa Española.

In August 2009, he signed a new deal with Liverpool F.C. (Montevideo), team which he participated in the 2009 Copa Sudamericana and the 2011 Copa Libertadores.

On 19 June 2012, he was transferred to the Belarusian side FC Dinamo Minsk.

In 2018, Figueredo rejoined Liverpool. He won the 2019 Torneo Intermedio, the 2020 Supercopa Uruguaya and the 2020 Torneo Clausura in his second stint with the club.

References

External links
 Profile at soccerway
 Profile at BDFA

1985 births
Living people
Uruguayan footballers
Association football midfielders
Uruguayan expatriate footballers
Expatriate footballers in Belarus
Expatriate footballers in Colombia
Uruguayan Primera División players
Categoría Primera A players
C.A. Bella Vista players
Villa Española players
Liverpool F.C. (Montevideo) players
FC Dinamo Minsk players
Deportes Tolima footballers
Montevideo City Torque players